Michael Philip Weston (born 21 August 1938) is a former  international rugby union player and captain.

Weston was capped twenty-nine times for England between 1960 and 1968, winning twenty-four caps as a centre and five caps as a fly-half.  He scored one try and one drop goal for England. He captained England five times, leading his country in all three matches of the 1963 England rugby union tour of Australasia, and then again in the final two matches of his international career in 1968. England won one and lost four of his matches as captain.

Weston was selected for the 1962 British Lions tour to South Africa, playing in all four internationals against  and  the 1966 British Lions tour to Australia and New Zealand where he played in the two internationals against  but not in any of the internationals against the All Blacks.

Weston was educated at Durham School. He played club rugby for Durham City and represented Durham County Cricket Club in minor counties cricket. His sons Phil Weston and Robin Weston  both played first-class county cricket.

References

External links
Sunday Times article 21 June 2009

1938 births
Living people
English rugby union players
Rugby union centres
Rugby union fly-halves
England international rugby union players
British & Irish Lions rugby union players from England
People educated at Durham School
Durham cricketers
English cricketers